The PFL 5 mixed martial arts event for the 2019 season of the Professional Fighters League was held on July 25, 2019, at the Ocean Resort Casino in Atlantic City, New Jersey. This was the fifth regular season event of 2019 and include fights in the featherweight and lightweight divisions.

Background
Several bouts were changed due to three fighters - lightweights Ramsey Nijem and Carlao Silva and featherweight Gadzhi Rabadanov - missing their weight marks for their respective bouts with all three removed from the card. As a result, defending lightweight champion Natan Schulte, Nijem's original opponent, instead faced Jesse Ronson, Silva's original opponent. Daniel Pineda, Rabadanov's opponent, was awarded three points for a walkover victory.

Results

Standings after event
The point system consists of outcome based scoring and bonuses for an early win. Under the outcome based scoring system, the winner of a fight receives 3 points and the loser receives 0 points. If the fight ends in a draw, both fighters will receive 1 point. The bonus for winning a fight in the first, second, or third round is 3 points, 2 points, and 1 point respectively. For example, if a fighter wins a fight in the first round, then the fighter will receive 6 total points. If a fighter misses weight, then the fighter that missed weight will receive 0 points and his opponent will receive 3 points due to a walkover victory.

Featherweight

Lightweight

♛ = Clinched playoff spot ---
E = Eliminated

See also
List of PFL events
List of current PFL fighters

References

Professional Fighters League
2019 in mixed martial arts
Sports in Atlantic City, New Jersey
Mixed martial arts in New Jersey
2019 in sports in New Jersey
July 2019 sports events in the United States
Events in Atlantic City, New Jersey